Marianela Huen (born 12 February 1960) is a Venezuelan former swimmer. She competed in four events at the 1976 Summer Olympics.

References

External links
 

1960 births
Living people
Venezuelan female swimmers
Olympic swimmers of Venezuela
Swimmers at the 1976 Summer Olympics
Place of birth missing (living people)
20th-century Venezuelan women
21st-century Venezuelan women